NAAA (gene) may refer to:
 ASAHL, a human enzyme encoded by the NAAA gene
 5-nitroanthranilic acid aminohydrolase, an enzyme class